The 1971–72 Montreal Canadiens season was the team's 63rd season of play. The Canadiens qualified for the playoffs but were eliminated in the first round.

Regular season

Final standings

Schedule and results

Playoffs
After winning the Stanley Cup the previous season, the Canadiens could not repeat. The Canadiens lost to the New York Rangers in the first round, losing four games to two.

Player statistics

Regular season
Scoring

Goaltending

Playoffs
Scoring

Goaltending

Awards and records
Calder Memorial Trophy: Ken Dryden

Transactions

Draft picks
Montreal's draft picks at the 1971 NHL Amateur Draft held at the Queen Elizabeth Hotel in Montreal, Quebec.

See also
1971–72 NHL season

References
Canadiens on Hockey Database
Canadiens on NHL Reference

Montreal Canadiens seasons
Mon
Mon